The Vaqueros de Bayamón are a Puerto Rican basketball team of the Baloncesto Superior Nacional based in Bayamón, Puerto Rico. The Vaqueros play their home games at Rubén Rodríguez Coliseum, a venue shared with the Liga de Voleibol Superior Femenino women's volleyball team Vaqueras de Bayamón. The Vaqueros are the most successful team in the history of the Baloncesto Superior Nacional, having won 16 league championships, their last being in 2022.

The franchise began in 1930 and still stands as one of the league's original clubs. Led by Rubén Rodríguez, Bayamón established a BSN record for most consecutive championships with 5, from 1971 to 1975. After losing in the 2001, 2002 and 2005 BSN Finals, the Vaqueros won their record fourteenth championship by defeating the Piratas de Quebradillas for the 2009 title, their first in 13 years.

In December 2020, the Vaqueros won their 15th championship and first in eleven years, winning the tournament that was held inside a bubble due to the COVID-19 outbreak.

Among other records, the Vaqueros hold the record for most games won in a BSN season, 29 of them, set during the 1993 season.

Rubén Rodríguez

Rubén Rodríguez played for the Vaqueros for 23 seasons, always wearing number 15. He debuted in the league in 1969 and scored 11,549 points and 6,178 rebounds in 631 games. He established various records in the league:
 Points in a career - 11,549 .
 Points in a season - 810 (1979)
 Points in a game - 52 (1973)
 Rebounds in a career - 6,178
He also had the record of rebounds in a season from 1978 to 2008; this record was broken by Lee Benson on May 3, 2008, also joining the Vaqueros.

Rodríguez spent his whole career with the team Vaqueros of Bayamón. With the Vaqueros, he won 9 national championships, 1967, 1969, five in a row from 1971 to 1975, one in 1981 and one in 1988, the year that the team inaugurated his actual venue, that carries his name, the Rubén Rodríguez Coliseum. He also garnered the MVP award in 1979, and, once the three-point shot was established for the first time in the Puerto Rican tournament during the 1980 season, he started making shots from behind the three-point line too.

Franchise history 

The Vaqueros de Bayamon team was founded in 1930 on what was formerly known as the Baloncesto Nacional (now Baloncesto Superior Nacional BSN) league, an amateur league. The team's original name was Bayamon. The Bayamon team won their first championships in the league in 1933 and 1935. Becoming the second team to win two titles in the league, they were guided by the Professional Head Coach Onofre Carballeira. During the following decade (the 1940s) the team was inactive due to WWII. By 1954 the team was competing in the BSN League again, but this time the team would be known as the Azules de Bayamón (lit. "Bayamon Blues") in Spanish. Under that name, Bayamon did not win a title.

The following season the team was renamed to The Vaqueros de Bayamon. This new name was given by the team sponsor Espasas Dairy Company as a reference to their business. It wasn't until 1967 that the team reached the Finals against the Ponce team, against whom the Vaqueros won the series and their third championship (their first in 34 years). The team was starting to become known as a competitive one around the league. In less than two years, the team would repeat its success when they reached the finals and conquered another title in 1969. The success of the team was about to reach its climax in the 1970s.  The Vaqueros won five consecutive championships during the decade, from 1971 to 1975. They became the top team in the league. During their golden era (1970s) the team was guided by coaches Roy Rubbins, Art Loche, Lou Rossini, Fufi Santori, Tom Nissalke and Del Harris. During the 1980s a new rivalry was taking place in the BSN; this time the Vaqueros had to battle for supremacy against the Guaynabo Mets team, which was led by Mario Morales and Federico Lopez. The Vaqueros de Bayamon won the final series against Guaynabo in 1981 giving them another championship. Another achievement for the team was their fanatics which were counted in many thousands by the 1980s and 1990s. In 1988 guided by Robert Corn the team reached the finals against the Canovanas team and once again won a championship. In the 90s the team had an average decade with two more championships in 1995 and 1996 Both against the Ponce Lions. These titles came with Flor Melendez, who had coached the team to their 1981 championship, as head coach.

By the late 1990s the team was about to face one of its worst decades since the 50s. From 1999 to 2008, the team could hardly make it into the semifinals (except in 2005 when they reached the finals and lost for the title against the Arecibo Captains in four games); as a consequence, the franchise's quality and prestige as well as the fan base began to decrease. However most of the fanbase remained throughout the years.

In 2009 the franchise won their most recent championship, tying at fourteen with the San German Athletics for most overall titles in the league.

Nowadays the team still is considered among the best teams in the league.

Coronavirus outbreak 
Late in 2020, it was announced that eight members of the Vaqueros were suffering from the coronavirus disease, heading into a November continuation of the 2020 BSN tournament at a hotel in Rio Grande.

Players

Current roster

Traditions

Uniforms 

The Vaqueros have two different uniforms: a white home uniform and blue road uniform. The design of the white and blue sets are nearly identical, with the team name featured on the front over the number, and the player's last name over the number on the back and under the vaqueros' logo. The shorts have golden stripes on the sides of the pants and shirts in both designs.

Arena 
Inaugurated in 1988, The Rubén Rodriguez Coliseum is the hosting arena for the team's local games. It was the  named after the former team player. This coliseum is the third-largest indoor sports arena in Puerto Rico. It can accommodate up to 13,000 spectators, though it is known that this arena was able to fit nearly 16,000 on the team's finals. The seating of the coliseum divides in three sections:
 Box area (Palco) (blue section)
 Middle area (Preferencia) (yellow)
 General area (orange)
Originally (by the 1980s and early 1990s) the home arena for the Cowboys was the Pepín Cestero Arena, also located in Bayamon.

Logos

Fan base 
The Vaqueros have always kept a large fandom, however within most of the last decade (from 2000 to 2008) it decreased due to the lack of success or championships. In the 1990s the fanbase of the Vaqueros reached over 12,000 fans. In the season '09 the fandom increased at a high tendency, as the team conquered its 14 championship. The attendance to the final game was estimated over 14,000 fans from which over 11,000 were Cowboys fans.  From 1988 to 2009 the team averaged just over 10,000 fans, which is still in the top of the BSN . The team has sold out every home final game since their golden seasons 1970s, Making it the largest BSN franchise according to many commentators.

Rivalries 
Some important rivalries during the team's history include (the teams who have been confronted in at least two finals.)
 The Ponce Lions (late 1960s and mid 90s)
 The Quebradillas Pirates (from the early 1970s to the late 90s and again started in 2009 with a Dalmau joining Bayamon and both teams reaching the finals.)
 Río Piedras (1969 and 1971)
 Guaynabo Mets (early 1980s)
 Capitanes de Arecibo (2005, 2010 and 2018)
 Vega Baja (former team/1933-1934)

Radio 

The flagship station for the Vaqueros is WIAC, 740 AM, the official flagship for the '09 season. The announcers are Ralph Pagán and Angel Pérez Moll. Transmissions are broadcast regionally through the local AM frequency and globally through the Internet. all games are broadcast live and games stats are provided in the transmission. Some other games are transmitted on WKAQ 580 (the official BSN flagship station for this season)

TV 

The Vaqueros TV broadcasts are transmitted by BSN on live television, which broadcasts some of the games. Announcers are Ernesto Diaz Gonzalez, Diego Marti and Leonel Arill. The transmission airs all of the selected games nationwide. The games can be seen on América CV Network (Channel 24), Direct TV (Channel 161).
These pre-selected broadcast are also re-transmitted to the USA throughout WAPA America channel. Games can also be seen throughout the Internet in mediasportstv (online live) or at the official team's webpage.

Championships

What follows is a detailed list of every championship:

5: The Vaqueros have the record in the BSN for most consecutive championships: 1971, 1972, 1973, 1974 and 1975.

2: The team won their last two consecutive championships in the years: 1995 and 1996.

Runners-up 
 The Vaqueros have been runners-up 8 times: 1930, 1934, 1970, 2001, 2002, 2005, 2010, 2016 and 2018

Team records
 The Vaqueros have the record in victories in a season with 28–1 (1972). The only defeat was against the Cangrejeros de Santurce.
 Season played - 67.
 Games played and victory averages - 1643 / .611 .
 Games won in a season - 29 (1993) .
 Points in a game - Bayamón 143 v. Fajardo 121 (1978) .
 Victories and defeats - 1004- 639.
 Consecutive victories - 29 in two seasons.
 Greatest attendance to a game: 17,621 people on September 8, 1969.
 Post-seasons' classifications: 21 consecutive classifications to the Post-season.
 Rebounds in a game: 29 (Lee Benson) 2008

References

External links 
 vaquerosahi.com - Rancho Cibernético de los Vaqueros en el BSN. 
 bsnpr.com - Official site of the Baloncesto Superior Nacional (BSN). 
 Vaqueros' Team History 

BSN teams
Basketball teams established in 1930
1930 establishments in Puerto Rico
Sports in Bayamón, Puerto Rico